All for Gold, or Jumping the Claim is a 1911 Australian silent film directed by Franklyn Barrett. Only a few frames of the film survive.

It was also known as Quest for Gold.

Plot
Englishman Jack Cardigan (Herbert J. Bentley) strikes gold and writes a letter to his girlfriend, Nora (Lilian Teece), to tell her of the news. He gives the letter to a friend, Ralph Blackstone (Hilliard Vox) who poisons Cardigan's drink, throws his body in the river and takes over his claim.

However, when in Sydney, he accidentally allows the letter to come into Nora's possession and she decides to investigate. While Blackstone goes back to the mine by train, she tries to beat him there by taking a speedboat across Sydney harbour, then driving a fast car. She arrives to find Cardigan still alive and recovering. Cardigan gets his claim back and is reunited with Nora.

Cast
Herbert J. Bentley as Jack Cardigan
Hilliard Vox as Ralph Blackstone
Lilian Teece as Nora Fraser
Ronald McLeod as Bert Fraser
E. Melville as warden
Walter Bastin as Jim Carey

Production
In 1911, the newly established West's Pictures wanted to get into feature production. They offered a £25 prize for a story about Australian life best suited for screen adaptation; bushranging themes were barred. Over 200 entries were received and the winner was stage comedian W.S. Percy for this script.

The car chase scene was shot near Springwood in the Blue Mountains. Lilian Teece had to drive a car alongside the passing of a fast train. The train arrived an hour earlier than scheduled and Teece had to chase after it. "Passengers craned their heads through the windows and urged the driver of the train not to be beaten by a woman",  said a contemporary newspaper report. Teece got in front of the train just before the train disappeared in a cutting. "If I had not passed him before I passed the camera I would have followed him to Bathurst", said Teece.

The movie featured an early example of split-screen technology, with one scene showing Nora making a phone call, a boatman receiving the call, and Sydney harbour in between.

Reception
The film ran for a week, at a time when that was rare for films, and screened in London.

References

External links

All for Gold copyright material at National Archives of Australia

1911 films
Australian drama films
Australian silent feature films
Australian black-and-white films
Lost Australian films
1911 drama films
1911 lost films
Lost drama films
Films directed by Franklyn Barrett
Silent drama films